Mocis disseverans, the yellow mocis moth, is a moth of the family Erebidae. It is found in the Caribbean and parts of the southern United States, including Mississippi, Florida and Texas.

References

External links
Images
Bug Guide

Moths described in 1858
Moths of North America
disseverans
Moths of the Caribbean